Mercadonegro (meaning "Black Market" in Spanish) is a Latin American salsa music group. Their debut album was released in 2002 from Bibomusic.

Use in dance performances 

The uptempo music of Mercadonegro makes many of its songs a popular choice in salsa dancing performances and competitions. The song "La Malanga" from their 2005 album "Salsa Pa'l Mundo Entero" was the most popular song at the 2012 World Latin Dance Cup, leading to the song being banned from the 2013 competition. "La Bendición" is another popular song from the group, which has also been banned from the World Latin Dance Cup for 2014. The song was also used by John & Andrew in the quarterfinals of season 9 of America's Got Talent.

Discography 

 Báilalo! [Bibomusic 2002]

   1. Mercadonegro llegó
   2. Tú me quieres pa' bien
   3. Regresaré
   4. ...Eso me duele (single)
   5. Tengo que decírselo
   6. Ibarreña
   7. La mujer que tengo
   8. Salsa pa'l bailador
   9. Yo se que es mentira
  10. Tributo an Eddie Palmieri
  11. La chica del barrio
  12. No hace falta tanto

 Salsa Pa'l Mundo Entero [Bibomusic 2005]

   1. La bendición
   2. La guarachera de Cuba (homenaje a Celia Cruz)
   3. Jamas
   4. Llego la hora
   5. A los orishas
   6. Pa'l callao
   7. Por una noche contigo
   8. La malanga
   9. Yo soy el son
  10. El negro
  11. Tu me gustas
  12. Aquí esta mercadonegro

La salsa es mi vida, 2017
Aquí Llegamos
Sin Cuero No Hay Salsa
Hay Amores
Pegaito
La Salsa Es Mi Vida
Pa Mi Colombia
Yo Que Jure
Chisme De Esquina
La Salsa De Ayer
Dime Que Si
Por El Bien De Los Dos
Pa Los Rumberos
Te Lo Pido De Rodillas
Homenaje A La Música Cubana (feat. Alexander Abreu)

References

External links 
mercadonegro.ch
Band profile on Bibomusic

Latin American music
Salsa music groups
Musical groups established in 2002